The Takhti Stadium is a multi-purpose stadium in Qom, Iran.  It is currently used mostly for football matches and is the home stadium of Qomi football teams who play in Qom Province Football League. The stadium holds 2,000 (1,350 seated) people.

External links

Football venues in Iran
Multi-purpose stadiums in Iran
Buildings and structures in Qom
Sport in Qom